Enstone Aerodrome is a small unlicensed civilian airfield in England close to Enstone in Oxfordshire, which is currently used for microlights, light aircraft and motor gliders.  The International Civil Aviation Organization (ICAO) designator is EGTN, and its contact radio frequency is 129.880. The Aerodrome Operators are Oxfordshire Sport Flying located close to the Runway 26 Threshold.

The aerodrome, 4.5 nautical miles east of Chipping Norton, has an asphalt paved main runway: 08/26, which is 1100 metres long, consisting of a tarmac surface over concrete base.  There is also a parallel grass strip "south side grass" of 800 metres which can be made available to some aircraft.

History
The aerodrome was built during the Second World War as a then typical triangular three-runway Royal Air Force Bomber Command airfield.

The aerodrome opened 15 September 1942 as RAF Enstone.  It started life as a satellite airfield for RAF Moreton-in-Marsh, and was used by Vickers Wellingtons of No. 21 Operational Training Unit RAF until April 1944.  A detachment of North American Harvards and Airspeed Oxfords of No. 17 Flying Training School RAF subsequently arrived at Enstone; these departed during December 1946, and RAF Enstone eventually closed in 1947.

Current use
It is currently used for general aviation (GA). The hard runway is run by Oxfordshire Sport Flying Limited who provide flying lessons over Oxfordshire in modern motor gliders.   The aerodrome is operational during daylight hours. All required information can be found on their website as well as PPR requests. www.enstoneaerodrome.co.uk/ppr

The Northside Grass Runway is run by Enstone Airlines. Enstone Airlines also provide maintenance for aircraft.

  In addition to aviation activities, the aerodrome is also home to a number of industrial activities, including automotive and general engineering, and accordingly, the site is also known as Enstone Airfield Industrial Estate.

It was used in 2018 as the race track for the 'Celebrity Face Off' segment of the British motoring show The Grand Tour (TV series).

See also

List of airports in the United Kingdom
List of former Royal Air Force stations

External links
Oxfordshire Sport Flying at Enstone Aerodrome — official website

References

Airports in England
Transport in Oxfordshire
Airports in South East England
Royal Air Force stations of World War II in the United Kingdom